Ernest Louis Aquilas Christophe (15 January 1827 – 14 January 1892) was a French sculptor, a student of François Rude and a friend of Charles Baudelaire. Rude assigned him to help with the bronze recumbent effigy to Éléonore-Louis Godefroi Cavaignac, a French politician. The funerary monument is signed Rude et Christophe, son jeune élève (Rude and Cristophe, his young pupil). His Le Masque (the Mask) sculpture won Christophe third place in the  Paris Salon in 1876 and two of his sculptures, La Fatalité (Fatality) and Le Baiser suprême (The supreme kiss) were acquired by the Musée du Luxembourg.

Christophe developed a deep friendship with  Cuban-born French poet José-Maria de Heredia and made him his testamentary legatee. De Heredia collected part of Ernest's library after his death. He is buried in the Batignolles Cemetery.

Notable works
One of Christophe's most recognized works is the Human Comedy sculpture that he submitted in 1876 to the Paris Salon. The Statue was acquired and exposed in the Jardin des Tuileries in 1877 and was moved to the Orsay museum since 1986 after restoration works in the Louvre. The sculpture inspired Christophe's friend Charles Baudelaire to write his poem Le Masque (the Mask). The sculptor renamed his statue "The Mask" with a nod to Baudelaire's ekphrastic poem. The work depicts a semi-nude woman whose smiling face is really a mask that hides "a face of sorrow".

La Fatalité, a statue executed by Christophe in 1885, inspired another French poet Leconte de Lisle's poem of the same title.

Gallery

References

Bibliography
 
 
 
 
 
 

1827 births
1892 deaths
People from Loches
19th-century French sculptors
French male sculptors
Burials at Batignolles Cemetery
19th-century French male artists